Broadlands is a census-designated place (CDP) in Loudoun County, Virginia, United States. It is a  master-planned community started and developed by Van Metre Homes in the 1990s. It is built on wetlands and is certified as a Community Wildlife Habitat by the National Wildlife Federation.

The population as of the 2010 Census was 12,313.

According to Data US, which includes US Census American Community Survey data, between 2012 and 2016 Broadlands had an estimated population of 13,872 people, with a median age of 33.9 and a median household income of $169,353.

Homeowners association
The Broadlands community is managed by Broadlands Association, Inc., a homeowners association that incorporated in 1995 and composed of nine resident members. Broadlands became homeowner-controlled in 2009. Broadlands also includes two apartment complexes with rental units: The Arbors at Broadlands and the Van Metre Broadlands Apartments. The median property value in Broadlands is $569,800, and the homeownership rate is 85%.

Education
Broadlands is home to three Loudoun County Public Schools: Hillside Elementary, Mill Run Elementary, and Eagle Ridge Middle School.  High school students attend Briar Woods High School.

Geography
Broadlands is located in eastern Loudoun County, just off the Dulles Greenway at Claiborne Parkway (Exit 5) or Ashburn Village Blvd/Moorview Parkway (Exit 6), midway between Dulles International Airport and the town of Leesburg, close to AOL's headquarters and other corporate centers. It is bordered to the northeast, across the Dulles Greenway, by Ashburn, and to the south it is bordered by Brambleton.

The CDP includes the pre-Broadlands community of Waxpool in the west. Most of the CDP drains via Beaverdam Run east toward Broad Run, a north-flowing tributary of the Potomac River. The westernmost part of the community drains west to Beaverdam Creek Reservoir, which flows to Goose Creek, another north-flowing tributary of the Potomac.

References

External links 
Broadlands Homeowners Association

Census-designated places in Loudoun County, Virginia
Planned cities in the United States
Census-designated places in Virginia
Washington metropolitan area